The  is a pilgrimage of thirty-three Buddhist temples throughout the Kansai region of Japan, similar to the Shikoku Pilgrimage. The principal image in each temple is Kannon, known to Westerners as the Bodhisattva of Compassion (or sometimes mistranslated as 'Goddess of Mercy') ; however, there is some variation among the images and the powers they possess.

It is traditional for pilgrims to wear white clothing and conical straw hats and to carry walking sticks. While the route was historically traveled by foot, today pilgrims usually use cars or trains. Some pilgrims receive the stamps and calligraphy on wall scrolls (for a decorative hanging) and on their white coats (to be cremated in) as well.

The goeika songs of the 33 temples are widely known and frequently grouped together.

Temples

See also
 Japan 100 Kannon, pilgrimage composed of the Saigoku, Bandō and Chichibu pilgrimages.
 Bandō 33 Kannon, pilgrimage in the Kantō region.
 Chichibu 34 Kannon, pilgrimage in Saitama Prefecture.
 Shikoku Pilgrimage, 88 Temple pilgrimage in the Shikoku island. 
 Musashino Kannon Pilgrimage, pilgrimage in Tokyo and Saitama prefectures.
 Chūgoku 33 Kannon, pilgrimage in the Chūgoku region.
 Kannon
 Buddhism in Japan
 Tourism in Japan
 For an explanation of terms concerning Japanese Buddhism, Japanese Buddhist art, and Japanese Buddhist temple architecture, see the Glossary of Japanese Buddhism.

External links

Pictures of all temples
Saigoku 33 Kannon Pilgrimage
By Bike around Saigoku

Buddhist temples in Japan
Japanese pilgrimages
Buddhist pilgrimages